Luis Pellicer Coma (19 September 1930 – 14 May 2018) was a Spanish professional footballer who played for Barcelona, Lleida, Hércules, Sporting Gijón, Málaga and Melilla, as a defender.

References

1930 births
2018 deaths
Spanish footballers
FC Barcelona players
UE Lleida players
Hércules CF players
Sporting de Gijón players
CD Málaga footballers
UD Melilla footballers
La Liga players
Segunda División players
Association football defenders
Footballers from Catalonia
People from Solsonès
Sportspeople from the Province of Lleida